The Chamber of Deputies of Santiago del Estero Province is the unicameral legislative body of Santiago del Estero Province, in Argentina. It comprises 40 legislators, elected in a single province-wide multi-member district through proportional representation using the D'Hondt system.

The Chamber convenes in the provincial capital, the City of Santiago del Estero. The president ex officio of the Chamber is the vice governor of the province, who is elected every four years alongside the governor of Santiago del Estero. For day-to-day affairs, the presidency of the chamber is held by the provisional president.

History
The establishment of the first legislature of Santiago del Estero was brought about by the adoption of the province's first constitution, in July 1956, during the governorship of Manuel Taboada. The first legislative body was known as the Hall of Representatives, and counted with 16 sitting members and 6 alternate members: the sum of all of these served as the first constitutional convention. Members of the Hall of Representatives initially served only two years in their post. 

In 1870, the cabildo of Santiago del Estero became the seat of the provincial legislature. Later, in 1928, the body moved to the old building of the Teatro 25 de Mayo. This would remain as the legislature's official seat until 2004.

In 2002, following a declaration of a state of "political instability" by governor and caudillo Carlos Juárez, elections were rescheduled to take place a year earlier than anticipated. Subsequent federal interventions continued to alter the province's electoral schedules. Since then, Santiago del Estero has maintained an altered electoral calendar wherein all province-wide offices (both the governor and the Chamber of Deputies) are elected the same year midterm elections to the National Congress are held. Santiago del Estero and Corrientes are the only two provinces currently employing this electoral calendar.

Building
Since 2014, the Chamber of Deputies has convened in a new building built with the exclusive purpose of housing both meetings of the body and legislative offices of its members. It is located on the corner of Avenida Roca and Patagonia, in the provincial capital, near the city's central bus station and not far from the governor's offices. The building was inaugurated by Governor Claudia Ledesma Abdala on 8 April 2014.

References

External links
 
Constitution of Santiago del Estero Province 

1856 establishments in Argentina
Politics of Argentina
Santiago del Estero Province
Santiago del Estero